

247001–247100 

|-bgcolor=#f2f2f2
| colspan=4 align=center | 
|}

247101–247200 

|-bgcolor=#f2f2f2
| colspan=4 align=center | 
|}

247201–247300 

|-bgcolor=#f2f2f2
| colspan=4 align=center | 
|}

247301–247400 

|-bgcolor=#f2f2f2
| colspan=4 align=center | 
|}

247401–247500 

|-bgcolor=#f2f2f2
| colspan=4 align=center | 
|}

247501–247600 

|-id=542
| 247542 Ripplrónai ||  || József Rippl-Rónai (1861–1927), a Post-Impressionist avant-garde Hungarian painter, known for working in the Les Nabis style || 
|-id=553
| 247553 Berndpauli ||  || Bernd V. Pauli (born 1945) is a respected meteorite aficionado and collector with keen interests in astronomy and Egyptology. Co-author of the Electronic Catalogue of Meteorites and Meteorite Craters, he has been a long-time member of the Meteoritical Society and a prolific contributor to the Meteorite Mailing List. || 
|}

247601–247700 

|-id=652
| 247652 Hajossy ||  || Rudolf Hajossy (born 1941) is enthusiastic physicist and senior lecturer at the Comenius University in Bratislava, Slovakia. || 
|}

247701–247800 

|-bgcolor=#f2f2f2
| colspan=4 align=center | 
|}

247801–247900 

|-id=821
| 247821 Coignet ||  || Michiel Coignet (1549–1623) was a Flemish polymath and astronomer at the court of Archdukes Albert and Isabella in the Spanish Netherlands. || 
|}

247901–248000 

|-bgcolor=#f2f2f2
| colspan=4 align=center | 
|}

References 

247001-248000